RMS Cedric was an ocean liner owned by the White Star Line. She was the second of a quartet of ships over 20,000 tons, dubbed the Big Four, and was the largest vessel in the world at the time of her entering service. Her career, peppered with collisions and minor incidents, took place mainly on the route from Liverpool to New York.

Requisitioned as an auxiliary cruiser during World War I, Cedric carried out patrol missions until 1916. Her large size being a handicap in this function, she was then transformed into a troop transport and transported soldiers from Egypt and Palestine, then from the United States in the direction of the European fronts. She then resumed civilian service in 1919.

During the 1920s, Cedric faced competition from increasingly modern ships. After having been refitted several times to adapt to new clienteles, she was withdrawn from service in 1931 and scrapped the following year.

History

Construction and early career

At the end of the nineteenth century, the White Star Line decided to build large ships at moderate speed, in order to take advantage of the area of comfort and regularity while achieving fuel economy. The first unit of series known as the "Big Four" was put into service in 1901, while a second ship built on the same model was already under construction: the Cedric. Built in the Harland & Wolff yards in Belfast under hull number 337, she was launched in Belfast on 21 August 1902, in a private ceremony which included several guests, amongst others William Pirrie, the chairman of Harland and Wolff and Bruce Ismay, chairman of White Star Line.

Delivered on 31 January 1903, Cedric made her maiden voyage on 11 February between Liverpool and New York City; and she was then the largest liner ever built. She quickly became popular, and while the company insisted that his name be pronounced “seedric”, the public called her “sed-ric”. Her entry into service allowed the company to establish a good service from Liverpool departures on Fridays, and to part ways with its thirty-year-old . Throughout her period of service before World War I, Cedric was mainly used on the route from Liverpool to New York. From 1906, however, she occasionally made cruises between New York and the Mediterranean each winter and sometimes also between January and March.

Incidents punctuated the beginnings of the ship's career. On 15 March 1905, when a measles epidemic raged on board, the liner was caught in a storm that damaged the ship, took its bell and shook the furniture in the middle of the panicking passengers. In 1910, the ship also suffered a fire at the quayside, but the damage was negligible. In April 1912, on the other hand, Cedric was involved in the events following Titanics disaster. The president of the White Star, Bruce Ismay, asked that the liner be detained in New York so that the surviving crewmembers  of  could return to the United Kingdom.

World War I

All were assigned to the Tenth Cruiser Squadron and tasked with patrolling between Shetland and Norway. Within this set, Cedric was assigned from November 1914 to patrol A, alongside Teutonic.

Nevertheless, Cedrics size made her a poor cruiser, and she was converted in 1916 into a troop transport, a function more suited to her size. She first transported troops from Egypt and Palestine, then from United States after their entry into the war. From 20 April 1917 to 18 March 1919, she served under the Liner Requisition Scheme and transported, in addition to troops, fuel oil for Royal Navy ships.

On 1 July 1917, Cedric collided with and sank the French schooner Yvonne-Odette with the latter losing 24 of her crew. On 29 January 1918, Cedric collided with and sank the Canadian Pacific ship Montreal off Morecambe Bay. Montreal was taken in tow, but she sank the next day  from the Mersey Bar lightvessel. On 24 July 1919, while the ship was docked in New York, a fire broke out in her No. 6 hold, prompting the intervention of city firefighters who found themselves trapped with crew members. Other teams of police and firefighters were needed to save the victims and bring the blaze under control, while the damage was estimated at $25,000.

Post-war career
Cedric was returned to her owner in September 1919 and refitted by Harland & Wolff. She was refitted to accommodate 347 first-, 250 second- and 1000 third-class passengers. In fact, immigration laws in the United States no longer allowed as many third-class passengers to be carried as they did at the turn of the century in a cost-effective manner. She then resumed her service from Liverpool.

On 30 September 1923, Cedric collided with Cunard Lines  in Queenstown harbour during dense fog. Neither vessel was seriously damaged, but Scythia needed to return to Liverpool to be repaired. On 26 December 1924, she was again the victim of a fire affecting a large shipment of Peruvian cotton on board; the ship was not damaged, but the cargo was lost. Finally, while she was in Boston harbor on 12 September 1926, she struck the river vessel Van, severely damaging it.

She continued her regular service between Liverpool and New York during the 1920s. In 1928, with new ships entering service, her age began to show and her first class became a "cabin class". Her last Liverpool–New York sailing commenced on 5 September 1931 and she was sold later the same year, for £22,150 to Thos. W. Ward and scrapped at Inverkeithing in 1932.

Characteristics
Despite having similar profile, Cedric boasted a slightly higher net tonnage, which translated into a few more cabins. On the other hand, the dimensions of the two ships were similar, with 213.8 meters long by 22.9 meters wide and 13.4 meters draft. The ship was fitted with two chamois-colored funnels with a black cuff, the hull being black enhanced by a white superstructure (colors displayed by all the company's ships). The funnels were surrounded by four masts which only served to support the lookout's nest (on the front mast) and the cables of the wireless telegraphy.

Internally, Cedric was decorated and benefited from many luxury amenities of the time. The ship offered lounge, promenade deck, verandah café, reading and writing lounge decorated with large bay windows, smoking room decorated with stained glass windows and dining room topped with a glass roof. The ship also benefited from its own orchestra. Finally, comfort was improved by the low extent of the roll. When commissioned, the ship could accommodate 365 first-class, 160 second-class and 2,352 third-class, for a total capacity of 2,577 passengers. In 1919, its capacity was reduced and it could carry 347 first-class, 200 second-class and 1,000 third-class passengers. Finally, in 1928, she was again converted to carry 300 cabin class passengers, 385 tourist class, and 530 third-class.

The ship was propelled by two propellers powered by quadruple expansion machines generating a power of 14,000 horsepowers. It sailed at an average speed of 16 knots, and could reach a maximum speed of 19 knots. At average speed, the engines consumed 260 tonnes of coal per day, which was significantly lower than most of her competitors. Technically, Cedric stood out from her sister ships by being equipped with the new Welin-type davits (those which were subsequently fitted to many vessels such as those of the s), instead of the swiveling davits.

Notable passengers
The leader of the Baháʼí Faith, `Abdu'l-Bahá, travelled on board Cedric from Alexandria, Egypt, leaving on 25 March 1912, travelling via Naples, Italy on 28 March and arriving in New York City on 11 April 1912. On 5 December 1912 he travelled on the Celtic from New York to Liverpool. Shoghi Effendi, as a youth 15 years old, accompanied ‘Abdu’l-Bahá from Egypt, disembarking in Italy.
 Titanic survivor Robert Williams Daniel, a banker who frequently travelled to England on business, returned to New York from Liverpool aboard the Cedric, arriving on 4 December 1912 to learn of the death that day of his friend and fellow Titanic survivor Archibald Gracie IV, whom he was to visit while in New York.
Future garment industry trade union leader Sidney Hillman sailed to the United States (his name was spelled Sydney Hilman on the passenger manifest) as a steerage passenger on Cedric from Liverpool in August 1907.

References

Notes

Bibliography

External links

"New White Star Line Steamship Cedric" (Marine Engineering, April 1903, pp. 165–170, feature article with photographs.)
RMS Cedric
Cabin Liners: Celtic / Cedric Interior Tour 
Collision with SV Yvonne-Odette

 

Ships built in Belfast
Passenger ships of the United Kingdom
Steamships of the United Kingdom
Ships of the White Star Line
World War I Auxiliary cruisers of the Royal Navy
1902 ships
Ships built by Harland and Wolff
Maritime incidents in 1918